Carlos Meléndez may refer to:

Carlos Meléndez (politician) (1861–1919), President of El Salvador
Carlos Antonio Meléndez (born 1958), Salvadoran football goalkeeper and manager
Carlos Meléndez (singer) (born 1965), Puerto Rican former member of Menudo
Carlos Meléndez (footballer, born 1997), Honduran football defender
Carlos Meléndez (athlete), see 2002 European Athletics Indoor Championships